The Alliance for School Choice is the largest organization in the United States promoting school choice programs. The Alliance for School choice supports the creation and expansion of school voucher, corporate tax credit, and other school choice programs. The organization is headquartered in Washington, DC, is designated as a 501(c)(3) nonprofit organization, and receives its funding through private individual and foundation donations.

History 

The Alliance for School Choice was launched on May 17, 2004, the fiftieth anniversary of the landmark Supreme Court decision Brown v. Board of Education, with headquarters in Phoenix, Arizona. The formation of the Alliance for School Choice represented the merger of three organizations: the American Education Reform Council, Children First America, and the American Education Reform Foundation. Clint Bolick, who was part of the legal team that argued the Zelman v. Simmons-Harris school voucher case before the U.S. Supreme Court, was appointed as the Alliance's first president in 2004. Bolick resigned his position at the Alliance in 2007 to take a new post at the Arizona-based Goldwater Institute. On January 16, 2007, the Alliance's board of directors announced the appointment of Charles R. Hokanson, Jr., a former official at the U.S. Department of Education, as the organization's new president. Hokanson became president of the organization in April 2007 and the organization subsequently moved its headquarters to Washington, DC. In November 2008, Hokanson left the organization and was replaced by the organization's chief of staff, John Schilling, who serves as interim president.

Activities 
The Alliance shares offices, staff and resources with Advocates for School Choice, which is a 501(c)(4) organization that promotes the benefits of school choice programs.

Alliance activities include assisting affiliate organizations in states, hosting informational events, working with parent activists and community leaders to enact and implement state programs, and publishing two magazines, the School Choice Digest and the Activist. The Alliance has also engaged in litigation efforts on behalf of parents. In October 2008, the Alliance announced the development of a new campaign designed to recruit 10,000 supporters of school choice. Individuals who registered on their site received free bumper stickers and magazine subscriptions. www.letparentschoose.org

See also
Bradley Foundation
Carrie Walton Penner
Charter School Growth Fund
Heritage Foundation

References

External links 
 Alliance for School Choice
 Organizational Profile – National Center for Charitable Statistics (Urban Institute)

Education policy organizations in the United States
Organizations established in 2004
Educational charities based in the United States
Charities based in Washington, D.C.
2004 establishments in the United States
Charter schools